Vadim Rimovich Sharifijanov (born December 23, 1975) is a Russian former professional ice hockey right winger who spent parts of three seasons in the National Hockey League with the New Jersey Devils and the Vancouver Canucks.

Playing career
Sharifijanov burst onto the international hockey scene in 1992, when he was named a tournament all-star after scoring 8 goals in 6 games at the European U18 Championships at the age of only 16. After two solid seasons with Salavat Yulaev Ufa of the Russian Super League, he was selected in the first round (25th overall) of the 1994 NHL Entry Draft by the New Jersey Devils. He spent one more year in Russia with HC CSKA Moscow before coming to North America, and also turned in a stellar performance at the 1995 World Junior Championships, recording 10 points in 7 games.

Sharifijanov joined the Albany River Rats, New Jersey's AHL affiliate, after the Russian season ended in 1995, and scored 2 points in his first North American professional game. However, his progress to the NHL would be slow in a deep New Jersey system, and his first three full seasons were spent almost entirely in Albany, appearing in only 2 NHL games during the 1996–97 campaign.

In 1998–99, Sharifijanov was finally promoted to the Devils and turned in a highly successful rookie season, recording 11 goals and 27 points in just 53 games. Stocky and strong on the puck, he displayed a well-rounded all-around game and a solid touch around the net.

However, in 1999–2000 his play fell off considerably. After scoring just 3 goals in 20 games for the Devils, and showing a marked drop-off in his defensive play, Sharifijanov was shipped to the Vancouver Canucks for a draft pick. In Vancouver, he made an instant impact, scoring a goal on his first shift as a Canuck, but it was all downhill from there as he quickly became a healthy scratch and earned a reputation for lazy play. He finished the season with just 5 goals and 10 points in 37 games, as well as a +/- rating of a dismal -13.

The 2000–01 season would prove no better, as Sharifijanov failed to crack the Canucks' roster out of training camp and was assigned to the Kansas City Blades of the International Hockey League, where he spent the entire season. Released by the Canucks, Sharifijanov returned to Russia. He would continue to struggle in Russia, however, and would suit up for 6 different Super League teams in the next three seasons without making any significant impact for any of them. After brief stints in France and Sweden, Sharifijanov signed on with Sputnik Nizhny Tagil of the Supreme Hockey League in 2005.

In 92 NHL games, Sharifijanov recorded 16 goals and 21 assists for 37 points, along with 50 penalty minutes. His sudden decline in ability while still a young player remains unexplained - at age 23, he was a key young player on an elite NHL team, and by the time he turned 26 he was already unable to hold down a regular job in the Russian Superleague.

Career statistics

Regular season and playoffs

International

External links

1975 births
Albany River Rats players
HC CSKA Moscow players
HC Lada Togliatti players
Metallurg Novokuznetsk players
HC Spartak Moscow players
Kansas City Blades players
Kazzinc-Torpedo players
Krylya Sovetov Moscow players
IFK Arboga IK players
Living people
National Hockey League first-round draft picks
New Jersey Devils draft picks
New Jersey Devils players
Rapaces de Gap players
Russian ice hockey right wingers
HC Rys players
Salavat Yulaev Ufa players
Severstal Cherepovets players
SKA Saint Petersburg players
Sportspeople from Ufa
Sputnik Nizhny Tagil players
Tatar people of Russia
Toros Neftekamsk players
Vancouver Canucks players
Yertis Pavlodar players